Linda J. Waite is a sociologist and social demographer. She is the George Herbert Mead Distinguished Service Professor of Sociology at the University of Chicago. In 2018, she was elected to the American Academy of Arts and Letters.

Education and career 
Waite has a B.A. from Michigan State University (1969), and an M.A. (1970) and a Ph.D. (1976) from the University of Michigan. She was named the George Herbert Mead Distinguished Service professor in 2020. At the University of Chicago, Waite has been co-director of the Center on Parents, Children, and Work, an Alfred P. Sloan Working Families Center (1997-2006), and was the founding director of the Center on Aging. Waite is past president of the Population Association of America.

Work 
Waite’s work uses empirical data to study the dynamics underlying major social changes that impact the life courses of individuals and families. Waite's research topics have covered women’s entry into the labor market, patterns of marriage and family formation, and, more recently, population aging and health. A central focus of Waite’s research on aging is the examination of marital quality and sexuality as critical components of health and well-being in later life. Waite’s early work on marriage showed it improves health and lengthens life. This early research led to the development of the National Social Life, Health and Aging Project (NSHAP), which provides data used by Waite to examine public discourse on later life sexuality, and demonstrates that sexuality is not just the province of the young.

Selected publications

Awards and honors
In 2012, Waite received the Matilda White Riley Award from the NIH Office of Behavioral and Social Research. In 2016, she received the Matilda White Riley Award for career achievement from the Section on Aging and the Life Course of the American Sociological Association. She was elected as a member of the American Academy of Arts and Sciences in 2018.

References

External links 
 

Living people
Michigan State University alumni
University of Michigan alumni
University of Chicago faculty
American women sociologists
Members of the American Academy of Arts and Letters
Year of birth missing (living people)